Two baronetcies with the surname Arbuthnot have been created for members of the Arbuthnot family—both in the Baronetage of the United Kingdom, and still extant.

Arbuthnot baronets of Edinburgh (1823)
The Arbuthnot Baronetcy of Edinburgh was created in the Baronetage of the United Kingdom on 3 April 1823 for Sir William Arbuthnot, Provost of Edinburgh.

 Sir William Arbuthnot, 1st Baronet (1766–1829)
 Sir Robert Keith Arbuthnot, 2nd Baronet (1801–1873) married Anne Fitzgerald, daughter of Field Marshal Sir John Forster FitzGerald, G.C.H., and his wife, Charlotte, child of the Hon. William Hazen. Lady Arbuthnot's Chamber is named after Lady Anne, who died at Florence, Italy, 6 March 1882, her husband having predeceased her on 4 March 1873. The couple had five sons and two daughters.
 Sir William Wedderburn Arbuthnot, 3rd Baronet (1831–1889)
 Rear Admiral Sir Robert Keith Arbuthnot, 4th Baronet (1864–1916), commander of the Royal Navy's 1st Cruiser Squadron; killed in action at the Battle of Jutland on 31 May 1916, knighted KCB posthumously 
Sir Dalrymple Arbuthnot, CMG, DSO, 5th Baronet (1867–1941), younger brother of 4th baronet
 Major Sir Robert Dalrymple Arbuthnot, 6th Baronet (1919–1944), 24th Lancers, killed in action at Normandy on 30 June 1944
 Sir Hugh Fitzgerald Arbuthnot, 7th Baronet (1922–1983), younger brother of 6th baronet; married Julia Grace, daughter of Major General Frederick Peake
 Sir Keith Robert Charles Arbuthnot, 8th Baronet (born 1951), educated at Wellington College and the University of Edinburgh.

The heir apparent is the present holder’s eldest son Robert Hugh Peter Arbuthnot (b. 1986)

Coat of arms

Arbuthnot baronets of Kittybrewster (1964)
The Arbuthnot Baronetcy of Kittybrewster in the County of the City of Aberdeen was created in the Baronetage of the United Kingdom on 26 February 1964 for John Sinclair Wemyss Arbuthnot, for services to church and state.

 Sir John Sinclair Wemyss Arbuthnot, 1st Baronet (1912–1992)
 Sir William Reierson Arbuthnot, 2nd Baronet (1950–2021)
 Sir Henry William Arbuthnot, 3rd Baronet (b. 2011)

The heir presumptive is the present holder's twin brother, John Walter Arbuthnot (b. 2011)

Coat of arms

Gallery

See also
Viscount of Arbuthnott

References

External links

Baronetcies in the Baronetage of the United Kingdom
!
Lists of Scottish people